Damian Dawid Szymański (born 16 June 1995) is a Polish professional footballer who plays as a midfielder for Greek Super League club AEK Athens and the Poland national team.

Club career

Early club career

Szymański started his career with GKS Bełchatów.

Akhmat Grozny
On 12 January 2019, Wisła Płock announced his transfer to the Russian Premier League club FC Akhmat Grozny. Three days later Akhmat confirmed that the club signed a 4.5-year contract with Szymański.

AEK Athens
On 13 January 2020, Szymański travelled to Athens to pass his medicals and complete a move to AEK Athens. The Polish midfielder will join the Greek club on an initial six-month loan, and AEK will maintain the right to buy him for a fee of €1,500,000. One day later, the deal was made official and Szymański was presented by his new club.

On 30 June 2020, Szymański penned a four-year deal with AEK after his transfer from Akhmat Grozny was made permanent. The Greek club paid €1,300,000 for his services, while Akhmat will keep a resale rate of 15%. Five days later, Szymanski scored his first goal for the club, sealing an emphatic 4–1 away win against Aris Thessaloniki.

On 20 January 2021, he scored helping to a 2–0 home win against Apollon Smyrnis for the first leg of the Greek Cup round of 16. On 15 February 2021, he sealed a dramatic 4–2 away win against AEL, after a low cross from Levi García. The following week, Szymański scored a brace in a 2–2 home draw against Asteras Tripolis.
On 5 December 2021, he was the only scorer in a vital 1–0 home win against rivals Panathinaikos.

At the start of the 2022–23 season, the appointment of Matías Almeyda as the club's new coach helped Damian to revive his career, eventually receiving a call-up for the 2022 World Cup. The Argentine coach managed to harness his athleticism and passion, making him a significant member of the team, thus attracting interest from various clubs including Standard Liège.

International career
Szymański made his Poland national team debut on 7 September 2018 in a 2018–19 UEFA Nations League A game against Italy. He made his first start for Poland in the return game against Italy on 14 October. He scored his first goal, an equaliser in the injury time of the second half, on 8 September 2021 in a 2022 FIFA World Cup qualification match against England held at the National Stadium in Warsaw, which ended in a 1–1 draw.

Career statistics

Club

International

International goals
Scores and results list Poland's goal tally first.

References

External links

1995 births
Living people
Polish footballers
Poland youth international footballers
Poland international footballers
GKS Bełchatów players
Jagiellonia Białystok players
Wisła Płock players
FC Akhmat Grozny players
AEK Athens F.C. players
Ekstraklasa players
I liga players
Russian Premier League players
Super League Greece players
2022 FIFA World Cup players
Polish expatriate footballers
Expatriate footballers in Russia
Expatriate footballers in Greece
Polish expatriate sportspeople in Russia
Polish expatriate sportspeople in Greece
People from Kraśnik
Association football midfielders